‘Olash’ is a coastal village in Jagatsinghpur district of Odisha, India. It is a village having a population of about 1000 people, and is located about 30 km from the district town of Jagatsinghpur on the Cuttack–Naharana road, about 5 km from the Bay of Bengal to the east. The village is known for paddy and Chilly cultivation and "Lotus club"- A premier social organization.

This village comes under "Apandara" Panchayat which falls under "Balikuda-Erasama" constituencies of Jagatsinghpur, Odisha, India. There are 140+ families in this village. The shape as in map looks like a square. It has two entrances and both are open to east of the village. It consists 5 divisions i.e. Danda Sahi, Tala Sahi, Gaon upara, Matha Sahi and Chhaka Upara, In the heart of the village "Lotus Club" and Olash primary school are situated. To view the map of the village please click on the link ..

To the west of the village there is a river called "Mugura Nali" which was, 50 years ago, connected to Devi River and its water was salty. There were a lot of sea creatures including as giant species of crocodiles. As a branch of Devi, whenever floods used to come the residual water used to flow through this river. But after construction of a Bandh, it was a dead river. Now one "Anikat" is going to be constructed for flood management and providing consistent water flow in the river. It is the life blood for the surroundings as irrigation depends upon it a lot. The scenic view of sunset on its silver water is wonderful and has enough magical power to feel anyone romantic. The charisma of the cool breeze from Devi River heals all the emptiness.

"Maa Budhi Sahadei" is the worshiped Goddess of the village. She is the living goddess for the villagers and they offer prasad by one family daily on a rotation basis and chronologically. A priest is appointed for the worship of daily deeds of the Goddess for a remuneration by the villagers. Non-veg is allowed here and also in each full moon day, the Goddess is being offered Prasad (flatted rice, Pudding and Dalma - a unique each odia's favourite and delicious food that is made out of a mix of dal, some vegetables and ghee). Once in each year, for the occasion of Marjana (Holiness) of the Goddess, the villagers contribute for a festival in the temple premise.

Most of the villagers are farmers. There are different types of Self-Help-Groups created by the village women by which they are living in a good economic standard and also they are working on some developmental works for the village. This village is well connected to roads and the good communication facility to all across the Market has made the business of produced agricultural products more feasible to earn a handsome return for the farmers.

The villagers also celebrate a lot of festivals including Dussehra, Raja, Kumar purnima, Dola, Manabasa, Panchuka, Saraswati Puja, Ganesh Puja, Akasatana, Janmastami, Agni Ustav and many more. Among these festivals "Saraswati Puja" is the most excited and awaiting festivals of the village which is considered as a grand local festival. All the near & dear are cordially allowed to cherish the feast as a group. 5-days-function is the sole attraction of this festival, consisting drama, various contests among inter-school students, Day & Night Cricket Tournament and many more cultural events which is arranged by Lotus Club.

References

Villages in Jagatsinghpur district